El extraño caso del doctor Fausto is a 1969 Spanish drama film directed by and starring Gonzalo Suárez. It was entered into the 20th Berlin International Film Festival.

Cast
 Gonzalo Suárez - Narrador / Mefistófeles / Octavio Beiral
 Alberto Puig - Doctor Fausto
 Olga Vidali - Helena de Troya
 Gila Hodgkinson - Margarita
 José Arranz - Euforion
 Teresa Gimpera - Esfinge
 Emma Cohen
 Charo López

References

External links

1969 films
1969 drama films
1960s fantasy drama films
1960s Spanish-language films
Films directed by Gonzalo Suárez
Spanish fantasy drama films
1960s Spanish films